The women's 50 metre backstroke event at the 2018 Commonwealth Games was held on 9 and 10 April at the Gold Coast Aquatic Centre.

Records
Prior to this competition, the existing world, Commonwealth and Games records were as follows:

Results

Heats
The heats were held on 9 April at 10:49.

Semifinals
The semifinals were held on 9 April at 20:57.

Semifinal 1

Semifinal 2

Final
The final was held on 10 April at 19:50.

References

Women's 50 metre backstroke
Commonwealth Games
Common